New York's 16th congressional district is a congressional district for the United States House of Representatives represented by Jamaal Bowman.

The 16th district includes a small portion of the northern Bronx (specifically the neighborhood of Wakefield) and the southern half of Westchester County, including the suburban cities of White Plains, Mount Vernon, Yonkers, New Rochelle, and Rye. 

From 2003 to 2013, the district included the neighborhoods of Bedford Park, East Tremont, Fordham, Hunts Point, Melrose, Highbridge, Morrisania, Mott Haven and University Heights.  Yankee Stadium, Fordham University and the Bronx Zoo were located within the district. Before redistricting, the 2010 Census found that approximately 38% of constituents in New York's 16th lived at or below the federal poverty line, the highest poverty rate of any congressional district in the nation. These neighborhoods were largely reassigned to the 15th district after redistricting, while the current 16th comprises most of the territory that had previously been the 17th District. The current 16th district, while still containing impoverished areas, such as some neighborhoods of Mount Vernon, also contains affluent areas, such as in Scarsdale and Rye, resulting in a more mixed-income demography.

In 2008, the previous version of this district gave Barack Obama his largest victory margin of any congressional district, a margin of 90% (95–5%). The current configuration of the 16th district is strongly Democratic, though it is not as overwhelmingly Democratic as other districts in the city.

Voting

List of members representing the district

Recent election results 
In New York State electoral politics there are numerous minor parties at various points on the political spectrum. Certain parties will invariably endorse either the Republican or Democratic candidate for every office, hence the state electoral results contain both the party votes, and the final candidate votes (Listed as "Recap").

See also

List of United States congressional districts
New York's congressional districts
United States congressional delegations from New York

References

Sources

Books

External links
 Congressional Biographical Directory of the United States 1774–present
 2006 Election Results from the New York State Board of Elections
 Federal Elections 2004: Election Results for the U.S. President, the U.S. Senate and the U.S. House of Representatives from the  Federal Election Commission
 2004 House election data from the Clerk of the House of Representatives
 2002 House election data "
 2000 House election data "
 1998 House election data "
 1996 House election data "

16
Constituencies established in 1803
1803 establishments in New York (state)